Albert William Fletcher, sometimes known as Bert Fletcher, was an English professional footballer who played as a half back in the Football League for Brentford and West Ham United.

Career

West Ham United 
Fletcher began his career with West Ham United and made his professional debut towards the end of the 1922–23 season, a successful campaign in which the Hammers won promotion to the First Division. Fletcher had a run in the team in September 1923, but managed just seven appearances during the whole of the 1923–24 season, scoring once. He was confined to the reserve team thereafter and departed Upton Park at the end of the 1926–27 season.

Brentford 
Fletcher dropped down to the Third Division South to sign for Brentford in 1927. He was a regular pick at wing half and centre half during the 1927–28 season and made 33 appearances and scored one goal in his solitary season at Griffin Park.

Norwich City 
After his departure from Brentford, Fletcher joined Third Division South club Norwich City on a trial basis, but he did not make a league appearance for the Canaries.

Career statistics

References

1898 births
Year of death missing
Footballers from Wolverhampton
English footballers
Date of death unknown
English Football League players
Association football wing halves
Brentford F.C. players
Association football central defenders
West Ham United F.C. players